Two ships of the United States Navy have been named Cockatoo, after the cockatoo family of parrots:

United States Navy ship names